Parliamentary elections were held in Estonia on 7 March 1999. The newly elected 101 members of the 9th Riigikogu assembled at Toompea Castle in Tallinn within ten days of the election. The elections proved disastrous for the ruling Estonian Coalition Party, which won only seven seats together with two of its smaller allies. Following the elections, a coalition government was formed by Mart Laar of the Pro Patria Union, including the Reform Party and the Moderates. It remained in office until Laar resigned in December 2001, after the Reform Party had left the same governing coalition in Tallinn municipality, making opposition leader Edgar Savisaar new Mayor of Tallinn. The Reform Party and the Estonian Centre Party then formed a coalition government that lasted until the 2003 elections.

Electoral system
The threshold was 5% of the national vote. Electoral cartels were not allowed any more, but it didn't prevent a party from including members of another party in its list.

Results

References

External links
Election results on the Estonian Electoral Commission website (in Estonian)

Parliamentary elections in Estonia
Estonia
1999 in Estonia